Agnese Allegrini (born 3 July 1982, in Rome) is a badminton player from Italy.

Biography
Allegrini played at the 2005 World Badminton Championships and reached the second round, where she lost to Eriko Hirose of Japan.

She played at the 2008 Olympic Games in Beijing, where she lost in the first round to the Ukrainian player Larisa Griga. She was the first ever Italian badminton player to compete in Olympic Games.

Achievements

BWF International Challenge/Series
Women's singles

Women’s doubles

 BWF International Challenge tournament
 BWF International Series tournament
 BWF Future Series tournament

References

External links 

 
 
 
 

Italian female badminton players
Badminton players at the 2008 Summer Olympics
Badminton players at the 2012 Summer Olympics
Olympic badminton players of Italy
Sportspeople from Rome
Living people
1982 births
Competitors at the 2013 Mediterranean Games
Mediterranean Games competitors for Italy